Menouf (from ) is a city in Egypt located in the Nile Delta. It has an area of 18.76 square kilometers. The city gave name to the Monufia Governorate that it is located in and it was the capital of the governorate until 1826. Menouf is one of the several continually inhabited ancient Egyptian cities in the governorate.

Name 
"The upper" in this case also means "southern", i.e. located upriver in relation to the Nile's flow (see Upper Egypt), which was used to differentiate it from Minuf as-Sufli, modern Mahallat Menouf.

The city's Greek name Onouphis comes from the Egyptian name as well.

History 
Panouf was a bishopric by the middle of the fourth century as evidenced by the attendance of Bishop Adelphis of Onouphis at a synod in Alexandria in 362.

During the Heraclean revolt the city was an important center of the Blues, loyal to the emperor Phocas. General Bonasus gave battle to the rebels east of Panouf and defeated them, but the city was captured by Nicetas in a short while.

By the XIX century the city went into decline. It had no gardens, its streets were narrow and dirty, and its houses small and badly constructed. The people drank the Nile water.

Notable people 
 Abraham of Egypt
 Pope Joseph I of Alexandria

See also

 List of cities and towns in Egypt

References 

Populated places in Monufia Governorate